Kuzin or Kouzine is a Russian masculine surname, its feminine counterpart is Kuzina or Kouzina. The surname is derived from the male given name Kuzma or Kosma, which in turn originates from the Greek κόσμος (kosmos), meaning order of the universe. It may refer to:

Aramis Kouzine (born 1998), Canadian association football player 
 Denis Kuzin (born 1989), Kazakhstani speed skater
 Marina Kuzina (born 1985), Russian basketball player 
 Olexandr Kuzin (born 1974), Ukrainian long-distance runner 
 Sergey Kuzin (born 1971), Russian motorcycle speedway rider
 Svetlana Kuzina (born 1975), Russian water polo player
 Valentin Kuzin (1926–1994), Russian ice hockey player 
 Vladimir Kuzin (1930–2007), Russian cross-country skier
 Yulia Kuzina (born 1976), Russian judoka

References

Russian-language surnames